Daniels v Campbell NO and Others, an important case in South African law, was heard in the Constitutional Court on 6 November 2003, with judgment handed down on 11 March 2004. The applicant was a woman married in terms of Muslim rites, whose husband had died intestate. The court noted that Muslim marriages were not recognised in South African law. It concluded that this violated section 9 of the Constitution. Accordingly, it was held that the applicant could inherit. The ambit of this judgment was restricted to de facto monogamous Muslim marriages; it was extended to polygamous Muslim marriages in Hassam v Jacobs. In this Context the word "spouses" was questioned

Facts 
An application was made for confirmation of an order of the Cape High Court which declared invalid and unconstitutional certain provisions of the Maintenance Act and the Intestate Succession Act for their failure to recognise as "spouses" persons married according to Muslim rites, and therefore to allow partners in Muslim marriages to benefit from their protections, which include the provision of relief to widows to ensure that they receive at least a child's share of their husbands' estates. The Muslim wife in this case was going to lose a house she owned which was registered in her deceased husband's name. In terms of the Maintenance of Surviving Spouses Act, certain benefits are conferred on "spouses", a term which did not include spouses in a de facto monogamous Muslim marriage.

It is important to note that the question before the court was not whether Muslim marriage is lawful under the Marriage Act. Muslim marriages have not yet been expressly recognised in South African law, although there is a Draft Muslim Marriages Bill.

Judgment 
Sachs J held that the word "spouse," in its ordinary meaning, should include parties to a Muslim marriage, because this corresponds to the way the word is generally understood and used, and because it would be far more awkward from a linguistic point of view to exclude Muslim partners than to include them. The historic exclusion in South Africa flowed not from the courts' giving the word its ordinary meaning but from a linguistically-strained usage and from cultural and racial prejudices. Both the intent and the impact of the restrictive interpretation were discriminatory.

The words "spouse" and "survivor" as used in the Acts would henceforth apply to partners to monogamous Muslim marriages. The court intentionally did not deal with the question of polygamous Muslim marriages.

See also 
 Amod v MMVF
 Hassam v Jacobs
 Ismail v Ismail
 Kahn v Kahn
 South African family law
 Women's Legal Centre Trust v President of the Republic of South Africa

References

Cases 
 Daniels v Campbell NO and Others 2004 (5) SA 331 (CC).

Statutes 
 Intestate Succession Act 81 of 1987.
 Maintenance of Surviving Spouses Act 27 of 1990.
 Marriage Act 25 of 1961.

Notes 

Constitutional Court of South Africa cases
2004 in South African law
2004 in case law
South African family case law
Law of succession in South Africa